Robert Bertie, 4th Duke of Ancaster and Kesteven, PC (17 October 1756  – 8 July 1779), styled Lord Robert Bertie until 1758 and Marquess of Lindsey between 1758 and 1778, was a British peer. He was born in Grimsthorpe, the second son of the General Peregrine Bertie, 3rd Duke of Ancaster and Kesteven (died 1778), and Mary Panton (died 1793)

On the death of his elder brother, Peregrine Thomas Bertie, Marquess of Lindsey, on 12 December 1758, he inherited the courtesy title of Marquess of Lindsey. He was educated at Eton College and St John's College, Cambridge.

About 1777, he served as a volunteer in North America. A lieutenant in the 7th Regiment of Foot, on 20 January 1778, he was promoted to a captaincy in the 15th Regiment of Foot.

On his father's death on 12 August 1778, he succeeded as 4th Duke of Ancaster and Kesteven, 4th Marquess of Lindsey, 7th Earl of Lindsey, 20th Baron Willoughby de Eresby and Hereditary Lord Great Chamberlain. He was the last to hold the Lord Great Chamberlainship as an undivided office. On 12 February 1779 he was invested as Privy Counsellor and was Lord Lieutenant of Lincolnshire.

He never married and died in Grimsthorpe on 8 July 1779 from scarlet fever. At the time of his death he was engaged to Lady Anna Waldegrave, daughter of James Waldegrave, 2nd Earl Waldegrave, and Maria Walpole, the illegitimate granddaughter of Sir Robert Walpole, the Prime Minister. Lady Waldegrave, after her husband's death, married in secret Prince William Henry, Duke of Gloucester and Edinburgh, a younger brother of King George III, a marriage which outraged the King and led to the passing of the Royal Marriages Act 1772. After his death, his fiancée married Lord Hugh Seymour. He was buried on 22 July 1779 in Edenham. On his death, the Hereditary Lord Great Chamberlainship and the Barony Willoughby de Eresby fell into abeyance between his two sisters, all other titles of his passed to his uncle. An illegitimate daughter of the 4th duke, Susan, was married to Banastre Tarleton; but there were no children.

References

1756 births
1799 deaths
20
People educated at Eton College
Alumni of St John's College, Cambridge
104
East Yorkshire Regiment officers
Lord Great Chamberlains
Lord-Lieutenants of Lincolnshire
Members of the Privy Council of Great Britain
Infectious disease deaths in England
Deaths from streptococcus infection
Royal Fusiliers officers
Robert
People from South Kesteven District